Udarj (also Romanized as Ūdarj; also known as Odarej and Owdarj) is a village in Darreh Doran Rural District, in the Central District of Rafsanjan County, Kerman Province, Iran. At the 2006 census, its population was 293, in 96 families.

References 

Populated places in Rafsanjan County